The International L series was introduced by International Harvester in fall 1949 as the replacement for the KB series and were available as everything from light pickup trucks and delivery vehicles to full-size tractor-trailers. Electric wipers, a radio, and a clock were optional. International would continue to produce the line until 1952 when it was replaced by the R series.

Development
Heavier versions such as the L-150 to L-180 models had taller bodywork to accommodate a bigger engine, beefier chassis, and larger wheels. To hide this in appearance, they receive an extra, full-width chrome grille bar underneath the other two and the headlights. The L-185-L210 models had a longer, narrower hood and taller grille than all the smaller models, surrounded by oversized fenders. These trucks were a different look although they have the same cab as the smaller trucks.
Of the pickup-type bodies, these were available in 6 ft and 8 ft lengths. On L-130 models, a 9-1/2 ft long pickup bed of same design was available and accommodated dual rear wheels. Two different styles of IH factory flatbeds with removable sides were also available for sizes up to L-180. Other bodies were designed around the basic truck chassis of each series, such as the "Metro" LM120-122 and LM150-152, the "bread trucks" used by bakeries or laundries for example. They hardly resembled the L-Line. The LB-140 Milk Delivery truck was also an oddity with its looks and revolutionary semi-automatic clutch, however it had the L-line face. The LC160-162 and LC180-182 cab-over trucks, or cab-forwards" as they were then called, were another oddity of their own.

The L series was also built in Australia, where it was called the AL series.

The first of the marketing names
The "Schoolmaster" : L-153, L-163, L-173, L-183, and L-193. The L-193 bus had the same nose style as the L190-up trucks.
The "Loadstar" : First introduced in the L-Line, as the L-164, L-174, L-184, L-194, and L-204. It was the model with the heaviest capacity within each series. The "4's" were the only ones to have the "Loadstar" decal on the dash.
The "Roadliner" : First introduced in the L-Line, assigned to the L-165, L-175, L-185, L-195, and L-205. The Roadliner was IH's specific "premier" tractor truck model "loaded" with comforts and work-ready, which means not all tractors are the "5's." It was common to see basic L-190 tractors or L-183 tractors, for example. The customer typically ordered the cab & chassis package they wanted and had a body or 5th-wheel installed elsewhere.

Mining, construction, and industrial
To further bolster its presence alongside IH's own massive line of heavy construction equipment and meet highway weight limits,  the LF-170, LF-190, and LF-210 series was built. These were tandem-axle 6x4 drivetrain trucks for hauling heavier loads than their 4x2 counterparts. For example, the GVW of a L-194 is 25,500 vs the 38,000 of the LF-194.

Engines
The lighter-duty versions were equipped with the all-new OHV "Silver Diamond" engines in two different sizes (220cid & 240cid), while the medium-duty versions retained the older 269 ci "Blue Diamond", also an OHV engine, although it was now called the "Super Blue Diamond" after some detail improvements. The BD-269 has the same peak power as the smallest, but offers more torque, at  versus  for the Silver Diamond 240.

L-series specs (1949)

 Engine
 Red Diamond 372 OHV inline-six (L-190)
 Red Diamond 406 OHV inline-six (L-200/option in L-190)
 Red Diamond 450 OHV inline-six (L-210/option in L-200)
 Transmission
 Three speeds forward, one reverse, synchromesh column mounted
 Four speeds forward, one reverse, non-synchromesh floor mounted, Model T9
 Four speeds forward, one reverse, synchromesh floor mounted, model T98 (option in L120-L170 after 5/50)
 Five speeds forward, one reverse, non-synchromesh floor mounted (L180 series, option in L160-L170)
 Overdrive Five speeds forward, one reverse, non-synchromesh floor mounted (option in L160-L180 series)
 Electric 2-speed rear axle (option in L160-up)
 HD Five speeds forward, one reverse, synchromesh floor mounted (L190-up, overdrive optional)
 Manual 3-speed Auxiliary transmission (option in L190-up)

See also

List of International Harvester vehicles

References

Further reading

External links
International Harvester L (Internet Movie Cars Database)

L series
Vehicles introduced in 1949
1940s cars
Pickup trucks
Trucks of the United States
1950s cars